The province of Bali in Indonesia is divided into kabupaten or regencies, which in turn are divided administratively into districts, known as kecamatan.  The province of Bali is divided into 8 kabupaten plus 1 independent city (kota), together divided into 57 kecamatan, in turn sub-divided into 80 urban villages (kelurahan) and 636 rural villages (desa). At the 2020 Census, the population was 4,317,404 people in a total area of 5,780.06 km².

Badung Regency

Bangli Regency

Buleleng Regency

Gianyar Regency

Jembrana Regency

Karangasem Regency

Klungkung Regency

Tabanan Regency

Denpasar

References

 
Bali